Georgia competed at the 2020 Summer Paralympics in Tokyo, Japan, from 24 August to 5 September 2021.

Medalists

Competitors

Athletics 

Field

Judo

Powerlifting

Shooting

Swimming

Wheelchair fencing

See also
 Georgia at the Paralympics
 Georgia at the 2020 Summer Olympics

References

Nations at the 2020 Summer Paralympics
2021 in Georgian sport
2020